The Modern Hebrew Poem Itself is an anthology of modern Hebrew poetry, presented in the original language, with a transliteration into Roman script, a literal translation into English, and commentaries and explanations.

Two editions of this book have appeared so far:
First edition, published in 1965 by Schocken Books. Edited by Stanley Burnshaw, T. Carmi, and Ezra Spicehandler. Twenty-four poets, 69 poems, 220 pages. Has no ISBN. Library of Congress number; 66-26731. Reprinted by Schocken in 1989. Reprinted by Harvard University Press in 1995.
Second edition, published in 2003 by Wayne State University Press. Edited by Stanley Burnshaw, T. Carmi, Ariel Hirschfeld, and Ezra Spicehandler. Forty poets, 106 poems, 359 pages. 

Poets included in both editions of the book
Chaim Nachman Bialik
Saul Tchernichovsky
Jacob Fichman
Avraham Ben Yitshak
Jacob Steinberg
Uri Zvi Greenberg
Simon Halkin
Avraham Shlonsky
Yochebed Bat-Miriam
Yonatan Ratosh
Nathan Alterman
Leah Goldberg
Gabriel Preil
Amir Gilboa
Abba Kovner
Tuvya Ruebner
Haim Guri
Yehuda Amichai
T. Carmi
Ayin Hillel
Dan Pagis
Nathan Zach
Dalia Ravikovich

Poet included in the first edition but not in the second
Avot Yeshurun

Poets included in the second but not the first edition
Zelda
Dalia Hertz
David Avidan
Israel Pinkas
Erez Biton
Hedva Harekhavi
Meir Wieseltier
Yair Hurvitz
Yona Wallach
Agi Mishol
Yitzhak Laor
Dan Armon
Ramy Ditzanny
Ronny Someck
Hezi Leskali
Amir Or
Admiel Kosman

See also
List of Hebrew language poets

Notes

Poetry anthologies
1965 poetry books
Israeli books
Schocken Books books